Abraham Wales (4 October 1907 – 24 July 1976) was a Scottish professional footballer who played as an inside right.

Career
Wales played for Baillieston Juniors, Bathgate, Bartonholm United, Kilwinning Rangers, Kilmarnock, Galston, Montrose, Luton Town, Kilwinning Eglinton, Leicester City, Queen of the South and Scottish Aviation.

References

1907 births
1976 deaths
Scottish footballers
People from Kilwinning
Footballers from North Ayrshire
Baillieston Juniors F.C. players
Bathgate F.C. players
Kilwinning Rangers F.C. players
Association football inside forwards
Kilmarnock F.C. players
Galston F.C. players
Montrose F.C. players
Luton Town F.C. players
Leicester City F.C. players
Queen of the South F.C. players
Scottish Football League players
Scottish Junior Football Association players
English Football League players